November 1st is a 2019 British drama film written and directed by Charlie Manton and starring Lindsay Duncan, Sophia Myles, Clint Dyer and Thom Ashley. It was released on 4 October 2019 at the Sioux City International Film Festival. The film was shortlisted for the 2020 BAFTA Awards.

Cast
Lindsay Duncan as Bonnie
Sophia Myles as Caroline
Clint Dyer as Carl
Thom Ashley as Arnie
Lisa Loops as Maid
Michelle Nali as Witness
David Thomas Coulter as Civilian
Lesley Hilton as Prison Worker
Dean Horler as Prison Worker
Nathan L Weller as Media Reporter

Release
The film was released on 4 October 2019 at the Sioux City International Film Festival, Iowa, USA.

Reception
The Independent Critic lauded Duncan's performance calling it "simply extraordinary."

Accolades
November 1st won many awards, including Best Film at the BAFTA/LA Student Film Awards, at the Brussels Short Film Festival, at the Lucca Film Festival, at the Münster Film Festival and also at the This Is England Film Festival. Lindsay Duncan won Best Actress at the 24FPS International Short Film Festival and Sophia Myles won Best Supporting Actress at the Overcome Film Festival. The film was named the "Best of the Fest" at the Snake Alley Festival of Film in Iowa, US.

References

External links
 
November 1st (Full Film) on Vimeo
Salaud Morisset, Short Films Production & Distribution

2019 films
2019 drama films
British drama films
2010s English-language films
2010s British films